Sergio Molina Silva (born 6 September 1928) is a Chilean politician who served as minister.

He is a member of the Chilean Academy of Political, Social, and Moral Sciences.

References

External links
Profile at Annales de la República

1928 births

Living people
20th-century Chilean lawyers
University of Chile alumni
Academic staff of the University of Chile
Christian Democratic Party (Chile) politicians